Trypticase soy agar or tryptone soya agar (TSA) and Trypticase soy broth or tryptone soya broth (TSB) with agar are growth media for the culturing of bacteria. They are general-purpose, nonselective media providing enough nutrients to allow for a wide variety of microorganisms to grow. They are used for a wide range of applications, including culture storage, enumeration of cells (counting), isolation of pure cultures, or simply general culture.

TSA contains enzymatic digests of casein and soybean meal, which provide amino acids and other nitrogenous substances, making it a nutritious medium for a variety of organisms. Glucose is the energy source. Sodium chloride maintains the osmotic equilibrium, while dipotassium phosphate acts as buffer to maintain pH. Agar extracted from any number of organisms is used as a gelling agent.

The medium may be supplemented with blood to facilitate the growth of more fastidious bacteria or antimicrobial agents to permit the selection of various microbial groups from pure microbiota.  As with any media, minor changes may be made to suit specific circumstances. TSA is frequently the base medium of other agar plate types. For example, blood agar plates (BAP) are made by enriching TSA plates with defibrinated sheep blood, and chocolate agar is made through additional cooking of BAP. Nutrient agar is also similar to TSA.

One liter of the agar contains: 
 15 g tryptone
 5 g "soytone" – enzymatic digest of soybean meal
 5 g sodium chloride
 15 g agar

References

 
 
 

Microbiological media